Cave City is a city in Independence and Sharp counties in the U.S. state of Arkansas.  The population was 1,904 at the 2010 census. The city was named for a large cave underneath the Crystal River Tourist Camp, which is the oldest motor court in Arkansas. Cave City is known for its award-winning "world's sweetest" watermelons and holds an annual watermelon festival in July.

Geography
Cave City is located at  (35.948087, -91.550952). The town is centered on, and partially located above, the Crystal River, an underground body of water located in the multi-room Crystal River Cave, for which the town is named. The beginning and ending of the water source has never been determined.

List of highways 
 U.S. Highway 167
 Arkansas Highway 58
 Arkansas Highway 230

Demographics

2020 census

As of the 2020 United States census, there were 1,922 people, 853 households, and 554 families residing in the city.

2000 census
At the 2000 census there were 1,904 people in 751 households, including 504 families, in the city. The racial makeup of the city was 0.3% Black, 96.9% white or European, 0.1% Asian, and 1.5% from two or more races. 2.5% of the population were Hispanic or Latino of any race.
Of the 751 households 34.8% had children under the age of 18 living with them, 49% were married couples living together, 14.5% had a female householder with no husband present, and 32.9% were non-families. 29.6% of households were one person and 14.7% were one person aged 65 or older.  The average household size was 2.45 and the average family size was 3.01.

The age distribution was 31.1% under the age of 18, 5.4% from 19 to 24, 24.9% from 25 to 44, 20.8% from 45 to 64, and 18% 65 or older.  The median age was 35.8 years. For every 100 females, there were 79.9 males.  31.4% of the male population and 40.3% of females were 18 and over.

The median household income was $23,163 and the median family income  was $27,292. Males had a median income of $21,397 versus $17,424 for females. The per capita income for the city was $11,925.  About 17.0% of families and 21.3% of the population were below the poverty line, including 26.3% of those under age 18 and 15.6% of those age 65 or over.

Education 
Students in the area can attend the Cave City School District.

References

Cities in Arkansas
Cities in Independence County, Arkansas
Cities in Sharp County, Arkansas
Populated places established in 1890